First Baptist Church is a historic Baptist church located at Geneva in Ontario County, New York. The church was constructed in 1893-1894 and is an example of Romanesque Revival style.  Constructed of brick with limestone accents, the main block is surmounted by a profusion of tower, turrets, and cross gables.  The front facade is flanked by two massive square towers.

It was listed on the National Register of Historic Places in 2002.

References

Baptist churches in New York (state)
Churches on the National Register of Historic Places in New York (state)
Romanesque Revival church buildings in New York (state)
Churches completed in 1894
19th-century Baptist churches in the United States
Churches in Ontario County, New York
Geneva, New York
National Register of Historic Places in Ontario County, New York